The ʻAhu ʻula (feather cloak in the Hawaiian language), and the mahiole (feather helmet) were symbols of the highest rank of the chiefly aliʻi class of ancient Hawaii. The feathered cloaks and capes provided physical protection, and were believed to provide spiritual protection for their wearers. There are over 160 examples of this traditional clothing in museums around the world. At least six of these cloaks were collected during the voyages of Captain Cook.  These cloaks are made from a woven netting decorated with bird feathers and are examples of fine featherwork techniques. One of these cloaks was included in a painting of Cook's death by Johann Zoffany.

Construction
The cloaks were constructed using a woven netting decorated with feathers obtained from local birds. The plant used to make the netting is Touchardia latifolia, a member of the nettle family.

The coloring was achieved using different types of feathers. Black and yellow came from four species of bird called ōōs. All species had become extinct by 1987, with the probable cause being disease. Black feathers were also sourced from the two species of mamo, which are also now both extinct. The distinctive red feathers came from the Iiwi and the Apapane. Both species can still be found in Hawaii, but in much reduced numbers. Although birds were exploited for their feathers, the effect on the population is thought to be minimal. The birds are said to have not been killed but, rather, caught by specialist bird catchers, a few feathers harvested, and the birds then released.

Hundreds of thousands of feathers were required for each cloak. A small bundle of feathers was gathered and tied into the netting. Bundles were tied in close proximity to form a uniform covering of the surface of the cloak.

Ahu ula given to Captain James Cook, 1778

When British explorer James Cook visited in Hawai‘i on 26 January 1778 he was received by a high chief Kalaniʻōpuʻu. At the end of the meeting Kalaniʻōpuʻu placed the feathered mahiole and cloak he had been wearing on Cook. Kalaniʻōpuʻu also laid several other cloaks at Cook's feet as well as four large pigs and other offerings of food. Much of the material from Cook's voyages including the helmet and cloak ended up in the collection of Sir Ashton Lever. He exhibited them in his museum, the Holophusikon. It was while at this museum that Cook's mahiole and cloak were borrowed by artist Johann Zoffany in the 1790s and included in his painting The Death of Captain James Cook.

Lever went bankrupt and his collection was disposed of by public lottery. The collection was obtained by James Parkinson who continued to exhibit it, at the Blackfriars Rotunda in London. He eventually sold the collection in 1806 in 7,000 separate sales. The mahiole and cloak were purchased by the collector William Bullock who exhibited them in his own museum until 1819 when the collection was again sold. The mahiole and cloak were then purchased by Charles Winn along with a number of other items and these remained in his family until 1912, when Charles Winn's grandson, Rowland Winn, 2nd Baron St Oswald, gave them to the Dominion of New Zealand. They are now in the collection of the Museum of New Zealand Te Papa Tongarewa.

Cook's mahiole and cloak are featured in episode 52 of the mini-documentary television series Tales from Te Papa.

Ahu ula in museums
The Bernice P. Bishop Museum in Honolulu has a 200-year-old mahiole and matching cloak. This bright red and yellow cloak was given to the king of Kauai, Kaumualii, when he became a vassal to Kamehameha I in 1810, uniting all the islands into the Kingdom of Hawaii.

The de Young Museum in San Francisco displayed several of these cloaks in a special exhibition in 2015.

The British Museum has three of these cloaks.

The National Museums of Scotland show a feather cloak that was given in 1824 from King Kamehameha II of Hawaii to Frederich Gerald Byng thanking for his service in London.

The Museum of New Zealand Te Papa Tongarewa has three ahu ula in its collection. All were gifts of Lord St Oswald in 1912. The Museum of New Zealand Te Papa Tongarewa believes that one of these cloaks was placed on Captain James Cook by the Hawaiian chief Kalani’ōpu’u.

Auckland Museum acquired a cloak for its collection in 1948.

Geneva Ethnography Museum displays an early 19th-century cloak on its permanent exhibition. It was considered the museums most precious item by the institution's founder, Eugène Pittard.

References 

Hawaii culture
Featherwork
Hawaiian regalia
Hawaiian words and phrases